The Balmoral Hotel, originally built as the North British (Railway Station) Hotel, is a luxury hotel and landmark in Edinburgh, Scotland. It is located in the heart of the city at the east end of Princes Street, the main shopping street beneath the Edinburgh Castle rock, and the southern edge of the New Town.

It is accessed from Princes Street, on its north side, and flanked by North Bridge and Waverley Steps. The latter gives pedestrian access to Waverley Station to the south, to which it was formerly linked.

History 

Resulting from a competition in 1895, the hotel originally opened as the North British Station Hotel on 15 October 1902. The site, 52 North Bridge, was previously the location of pharmacists Duncan, Flockhart and company; William Flockhart supplied surgeon Doctor (later Sir) James Young Simpson with the first chloroform anaesthetic, which he tried on himself at his home 52 Queen Street, Edinburgh in 1847, and became standard practice in childbirth. A local newspaper reports that the International Association for the Study of Pain dedicated a plaque here in 1981 as part of an article on a Charlotte Brontë letter coming to auction.  

The building's architecture is Victorian, influenced by the traditional Scottish baronial style.  It was designed by architect William Hamilton Beattie and for most of the 20t century it was known as the North British Hotel or the N.B., a traditional railway hotel built for the North British Railway Company adjacent to their newly rebuilt Waverley station. While under railway ownership, the hotel had porters in red jackets who would take passengers and their luggage directly into the hotel via a lift. Ownership passed into the hands of the London & North Eastern Railway (LNER) in 1923.

After nationalisation of the railways in 1948, the hotel became part of British Transport Hotels until it was privatised and purchased by The Gleneagles Hotel Company in 1983.

In 1988, the hotel closed for a major refurbishment and the building was purchased in 1990 by Balmoral International Hotels. On 12 June 1991, Edinburgh-born actor Sean Connery officially reopened the hotel as The Balmoral, Gaelic for 'majestic dwelling', following a £23,000,000 refurbishment. A plaque to commemorate the occasion appears in the hotel lobby beside the lifts. The hotel then became part of the Forte Group forming part of their "Forte Grand" collection of international high-end hotels.

Following a hostile takeover of Forte Group in 1996 by Granada plc, the Balmoral was put up for sale by its new owners and became the first hotel purchased by the newly formed Rocco Forte Hotels created by Sir Rocco Forte in 1997, following the takeover of their former business by Granada plc, effectively repurchasing one of Forte Group's hotels.

Its traditional rival has always been the Caledonian Hotel at the west end of Princes Street; this was once the station hotel for the now-demolished Princes Street station of the Caledonian Railway, which was North British Railway's principal rival railway company.

Clock 
 Maintained by the Scottish clockmakers James Ritchie & Son since 1902, the hotel's clock is set three minutes fast to ensure the people catch their trains. The only day it runs on time is 31 December (Hogmanay), for the city's New Year celebrations. The hotel elected to change that for 2020, citing a desire to have three minutes less of that year.

Media

Laurel and Hardy (1932)

In July 1932, American comedy duo Laurel and Hardy visited the North British Station Hotel as part of their visit to Edinburgh. Crowds gathered outside the hotel to catch a glimpse of the famous pair. Their visit was one of the earliest videos of the hotel captured on film.

Michael Palin (1980)
Michael Palin stayed at the North British in 1980, as part of his "Confessions of a Trainspotter" journey from London Euston to Kyle of Lochalsh for the BBC show Great Railway Journeys of the World.

J.K. Rowling and Harry Potter (2007)

In February 2007 it was confirmed that author J. K. Rowling finished the Harry Potter series, Harry Potter and the Deathly Hallows at this hotel. Rowling left a signed statement written on a marble bust of Hermes in her room saying; "JK Rowling finished writing Harry Potter and the Deathly Hallows in this room (552) on 11th Jan 2007". The room has since been renamed the "J.K. Rowling Suite," and the marble bust has been placed in a glass display case to protect it. The suite, priced at nearly £1,000 per night, is a pilgrimage site for Harry Potter fans.

Oprah (2010)
In October 2010, Oprah Winfrey filmed a one-hour episode of Oprah at The Balmoral. She interviewed J. K. Rowling from room 230, the Scone & Crombie Royal Suite. Oprah asked Rowling: "Is there anything particularly here at this hotel where we are, that you thought would be particularly stimulating to your creative process?", to which Rowling replied:

It turned out to be stimulating. As I was finishing Deathly Hallows there came a day when the window cleaner came, the kids were at home, the dogs were barking and I could not work, and this light bulb went on over my head and I thought, I can throw money at this problem. I can now solve this problem. For years and years and years, I would go to a cafe and sit in a different kind of noise and work. I thought I could go to a quiet place. so I came to this hotel because it's a beautiful hotel, but I didn't intend to stay here. Still, they were so nice to me here and, I think writers can be a little bit superstitious the first day of writing went well so I kept coming back to this hotel and I ended up finishing the last of the Harry Potter books in this hotel.

Hallam Foe (2007)

The hotel is the fictional setting for a large portion of the 2007 Scottish film Hallam Foe, where the principal character beds down in the clock tower, and spies on his love interest in Cockburn Street.

Top Gear (2009)

In May 2009, The Balmoral Bar was the finishing point for the Top Gear 1949 themed race from London King's Cross to Edinburgh Waverley. Jeremy Clarkson travelled on LNER Peppercorn Class A1 60163 Tornado steam train, James May in a Jaguar XK120 and Richard Hammond on a Vincent Black Shadow motorbike. May won the race, with Clarkson coming second.

References

External links
The Balmoral Hotel's Official Website

Hotel buildings completed in 1902
Railway hotels in Scotland
Scottish baronial architecture
Edwardian architecture
Hotels in Edinburgh
Category B listed buildings in Edinburgh
Listed hotels in Scotland
Hotels established in 1902
1902 establishments in Scotland
Clock towers in the United Kingdom